Oxyopes heterophthalmus is a lynx spider from the family Oxyopidae, it is the type species of the genus Oxyopes and was described by Pierre André Latreille in 1804, it has a Palearctic distribution.

Description
The palps of the male have a dorsally directed patellar apophysis, which is nearly as long as male's palpal tibia. The epigyne has a reddish-brown median part, and is broadly rounded anteriorly. The body colour is dark brown, with a whitish pattern on the dorsum. The legs are black, with bright hairs and strikingly robust spines. Their abdomen is roughly triangular in shape and ends in a point.

Biology
Oxyopes heterophthalmus is a long legged, diurnal hunting spider which is capable of running very fast and jumping on their prey in a similar fashion to a cat, leading to their common name of lynx spider. They do not utilise webs to catch prey. In Great Britain adults occur in late May and June. The female spins a cocoon which is attached to a plant, she guards this until the eggs hatch.

Habitat
Oxyopes heterophthalmus is normally found in mature dry heathland. It has a preference for heather and other low shrubs.

Distribution
Oxyopes heterophthalmus has a Palearctic distribution. In Europe it is found in Central and Southern Europe, and is more common to the south. In Great Britain it is confined to a few sites in southern England.

References

Spiders of Europe
Palearctic spiders
Oxyopidae
Spiders described in 1804